The Faculté Libre de Médecines Naturelles et d'Ethnomédecine (FLMNE) is a professional training organization, based in Paris (France) founded by Jean-Pierre Willem in 1987. It was transformed into a company in 1997. According to Hubert Willem, every true medicine should work to lose because it is aimed to give health to patients.

See also
 Heilpraktiker
 Medecins Aux Pieds Nus

External links
 Official website

Training organizations
Health care in France
Organizations established in 1987
1987 establishments in France